The Grantchester Mysteries is a series of cosy mystery crime fiction books of short stories by the British author James Runcie, beginning during the 1950s in Grantchester, a village near Cambridge in England. The books feature the clergyman-detective Canon Sidney Chambers, an Honorary Canon of Ely Cathedral.

History
The first volume in the series, Sidney Chambers and the Shadow of Death, was published in 2012. The book comprises six short standalone mysteries. The second, Sidney Chambers and the Perils of the Night, was published in 2013.

Titles
The books in the series include:

 Sidney Chambers and the Shadow of Death (2012)
 Sidney Chambers and The Perils of the Night (2013)
 Sidney Chambers and The Problem of Evil (2014)
 Sidney Chambers and The Forgiveness of Sins (2015)
 Sidney Chambers and The Dangers of Temptation (2016)
 Sidney Chambers and the Persistence of Love (2017)
 The Road to Grantchester (2019)

A total of seven books have been written so far, with the latest being a prequel. The series was inspired by James Runcie's father, the former Archbishop of Canterbury, Robert Runcie.

TV series
In 2014, some of The Grantchester Mysteries short stories were turned into an ITV drama titled Grantchester. Filmed on location in Grantchester, Cambridge, and London, the initial six-part series was shown in the UK in Autumn 2014. A second series was broadcast in 2016, and has been ongoing since.

References

External links
 The Grantchester Mysteries website

Book series introduced in 2012
2012 short story collections
British short story collections
Works set in the 1950s
Detective fiction short story collections
Mystery short story collections
Series of books
Cambridgeshire in fiction
Cambridge in fiction